John Purroy Mitchel (July 19, 1879 – July 6, 1918) was the 95th mayor of New York, from 1914 to 1917. At 34, he was the second-youngest mayor and he is sometimes referred to as "The Boy Mayor of New York." Mitchel is remembered for his short career as leader of reform politics in New York as well as for his early death as a US Army Air Service officer in the last months of World War I. Mitchel's staunchly Catholic New York family had been founded by his paternal grandfather and namesake, John Mitchel, an Ulster Presbyterian Young Irelander who became a renowned writer and leader in the Irish independence movement and a staunch supporter of the Confederate States.

Reformers praised him. Oswald Garrison Villard, the editor of The Nation, said he was "the ablest and best Mayor New York ever had." Former President Theodore Roosevelt, endorsing Mitchel's re-election bid in 1917, stated that he had "given us as nearly an ideal administration of the New York City government as I have seen in my lifetime." However, even his staunchest supporters admitted he was a poor politician who was too aloof from the ordinary voters and too concerned with "scientific" urban management. He still won in a landslide in 1913 but lost the Republican primary in 1917.

Early life
John Purroy Mitchel was born on July 19, 1879 at Fordham, Bronx, New York City to James Mitchel, a New York City fire marshal, and Mary Purroy, who worked as a schoolteacher until her marriage. His father James was a veteran of the Confederate States army and two of his uncles had been killed fighting for the Confederacy. James was Irish, and Presbyterian in faith, the son of the famous Irish nationalist, John Mitchel. His maternal grandfather, Venezuelan-born Juan Bautista Purroy, was that country's consul in New York, which made Mitchel the first Mayor of New York City of Latino descent. Mitchel's great-grandfather, José Joaquin de Purroy, was a lawyer from Spain who settled in Venezuela. The Purroy family also included leading politicians in The Bronx.  He graduated from a Catholic secondary school at Fordham Preparatory School in the late 1890s. He obtained his bachelor's degree from Columbia College in 1899 and graduated from New York Law School in 1902 with honors. Mitchel then pursued a career as a private attorney.

Early career
In December 1906, Mitchel's career took flight when he was hired by family friend and New York City corporation counsel, William B. Ellison to investigate the office of John F. Ahearn, borough president of Manhattan, for incompetence, waste and inefficiency. As a result, Ahearn was dismissed as borough president of Manhattan. Mitchel began his career as assistant corporation counsel and then became a member of the Commissioners of Accounts, from which he investigated city departments. Mitchel gained results and recognition for his thorough and professional investigations into various city departments and high-ranking officials. Mitchel, with the help of Henry Bruere and other staff members of the Bureau of Municipal Research turned the insignificant Commissioners of Accounts into an administration of importance.

The young Mitchel's reputation as a reformer garnered him the support of the anti-Tammany forces. In 1909, Mitchel was elected president of the board of aldermen (an organization similar to the current city council). As president of the board of aldermen, Mitchel was able to enact fiscal reforms. Mitchel cut waste and improved accounting practices. Also, Mitchel unsuccessfully fought for a municipal owned transit system and the city saw Mitchel vote against allowing the Interborough Rapid Transit and the Brooklyn Rapid Transit companies permission to extend their existing subway and elevated lines. For a six-week period in 1910 after current Mayor William J. Gaynor was injured by a bullet wound, Mitchel served as acting mayor. His biggest accomplishment during his short tenure was the act of neutrality during a garment industry strike.

Political career

Mayoral campaign 
As the mayoral election approached in 1913, the Citizens Municipal Committee of 107 set out to find a candidate that would give New York "a non-partisan, efficient and progressive government." They were assisted in this endeavor by the Fusion Executive Committee, led by Joseph M. Price of the City Club of New York. After nine ballots, Mitchel was nominated as a candidate for mayor. During his campaign, Mitchel focused on making City Hall a place of decency and honesty. He also focused on business as he promised New Yorkers that he would modernize the administrative and financial machinery and the processes of city government.

At the age of 34, Mitchel was elected mayor on the Republican Party slate as he won an overwhelming victory, defeating Democratic candidate Edward E. McCall by 121,000 votes, thus becoming the second youngest mayor of New York City. He was often referred to as "The Boy Mayor of New York."

Tenure as mayor

Mitchel's administration introduced widespread reforms, particularly in the Police Department, which had long been highly corrupt and which was cleaned up by Mitchel's Police Commissioner Arthur Woods. Woods was able to break up gangs and in his first year in office, he arrested more than 200 criminals. Woods also launched an attack on robbery, prostitution, pickpocketing and gambling. Woods ultimately transformed the police department into a crime-fighting machine. Mitchel aimed to get rid of corruption wherever he saw it. Mitchel's administration set out to restructure and modernize New York City and its government. Mitchel was able to expand the city's regulatory activities, ran the police department more honestly and efficiently and much like in 1910 he maintained impartiality during garment and transportation workers strikes in 1916.

At 1:30 P.M., on April 17, 1914, Michael P. Mahoney fired a gun at the mayor as Mitchel was getting in his car to go to lunch. The bullet ricocheted off a pedestrian and hit Frank Lyon Polk, New York City's corporation counsel, in the chin.

Mitchel's early popularity was soon diminished due to his fiscal policies and vision of education. Mitchel was heavily criticized for combining vocational and academic courses. Mitchel began to trim the size of the board of education and attempted to control teachers' salaries.

Mitchel advocated universal military training to prepare for war. In a speech at Princeton University on March 1, 1917, he described universal military training as "the [only] truly democratic solution to the problem of preparedness on land." His universal military training alienated New Yorkers and was not popular. Many felt he focused too much on military patriotism and was indifferent to politics. This soon led to a loss of support for his re-election bid in 1917.

Mitchel ran again for mayor in the highly charged wartime election of 1917. His reelection bid took a hit as many New Yorkers felt he was socializing with the social elite, focused too much on the economy and efficiency and his concern on military preparedness. He narrowly lost the Republican primary to William M. Bennett after a contentious recount but then ran for re-election as a pro-war Fusion candidate.

His main campaign theme was patriotism, with a media campaign that denounced Germans, Irish, and Jews as unpatriotic sympathizers with the enemy cause. Mitchel ran against Republican Bennett; antiwar Socialist Morris Hillquit; and the Tammany Hall Democrat John F. Hylan. Hylan ridiculed and denounced Mitchel's upper-class reform as an affront to democracy and to the voters. He won by a landslide without taking a clear position on the war. (Mitchel barely beat Hillquit for second place.)

A 1993 survey of historians, political scientists and urban experts conducted by Melvin G. Holli of the University of Illinois at Chicago ranked Mitchel as the seventeenth-worst American big-city mayor to have served between the years 1820 and 1993.

Death
After failing to get re-elected, Mitchel joined the Air Service as a flying cadet, completing training in San Diego and obtaining the rank of major. On the morning of July 6, 1918, when returning from a short military training flight to Gerstner Field, near Lake Charles, Louisiana, his plane suddenly went into a nose dive, causing Mitchel to fall from his plane due to an unfastened seatbelt. Mitchel plummeted  to his death, his body landing in a marsh about a half mile south of the field.

Mitchel's body was returned to New York City. His funeral was held at Saint Patrick's Cathedral in Manhattan, and he was buried in Woodlawn Cemetery in the Bronx, on July 11, 1918.

Legacy

Mitchel Field on Long Island was named for him in 1918. A bronze memorial plaque with Mitchel's likeness is also affixed between the two stone pylons at the western end of Hamilton Hall, the main college building at Columbia University. A plaque of his likeness is on the entrance to the base of the Central Park Reservoir elevated cinder jogging track at 90th Street and Fifth Avenue entrance to Central Park.

The Fire Department of New York operated a fireboat named John Purroy Mitchel from 1921 to 1966.

In 2015, indie folk artist Joanna Newsom released a song named "Sapokanikan" in advance of her album Divers. The song, which contains numerous references to the history of New York City, prominently features Mitchel and the circumstances of his death.

See also
 William Brown Meloney (1878–1925), author of an unpublished manuscript on Mitchel's life
 List of mayors of New York City

Footnotes

Further reading
 Lewinson, Edwin R. John Purroy Mitchel: The Boy Mayor of New York (Astra Books, 1965)
 McClymer, John. "Of 'Mornin Glories' and 'Fine Old Oaks': John Purroy Mitchel, Al Smith, and Reform as an Expression of Irish American Aspiration," in Ronald H. Bayor and Timothy J. Meagher, eds. The New York Irish (Johns Hopkins University Press, 1997), pp. 374–394.

External links

1879 births
1918 deaths
20th-century American politicians
Deaths by falling out of an aircraft
American Roman Catholics
Burials at Woodlawn Cemetery (Bronx, New York)
Columbia College (New York) alumni
New York Law School alumni
American people of Irish descent
American people of Spanish descent
American people of Venezuelan descent
Mayors of New York City
New York (state) Republicans
Military personnel from New York City
United States Army officers
Accidental deaths in Louisiana
Aviators killed in aviation accidents or incidents in the United States
Collectors of the Port of New York
American amputees
19th-century American politicians
Victims of aviation accidents or incidents in 1918
United States Army Air Service pilots of World War I
Fordham Preparatory School alumni